Mount Frissell, which straddles the border of southwest Massachusetts and northwest Connecticut, is a prominent peak of the Taconic Range. Frissel's south slopes include the highest point in Connecticut.

Frissell's summit and the majority of its slopes are within Massachusetts' Mount Washington State Forest and part the town of Mount Washington, Massachusetts. Its southern slopes are in Salisbury, Connecticut.

Mount Frissell is traversed by the Mount Frissell Trail which connects with the South Taconic Trail to the west and the Appalachian Trail to the east.

The south side of Mount Frissell drains into Riga Lake and South Pond, then into Wachocostinook Brook, Salmon Creek, the Housatonic River, and Long Island Sound. The northwest side drains into Ashley Hill Brook, thence Bash Bish Brook, the Roeliff Jansen Kill, the Hudson River, and Upper New York Bay. The northeast side drains into Sages Ravine, thence into Schenob Brook, the Hubbard Brook, the Housatonic River, and Long Island Sound. Mount Frissell is bordered by Round Mountain to the southeast, Mount Ashley to the north, and Brace Mountain to the west.

See also
Outline of Connecticut
Index of Connecticut-related articles
List of U.S. states by elevation
Mountain peaks of North America
Mountain peaks of the United States

References

External links 
 
 
 
 Mount Frissell on Peakery.com
 Mount Frissell Guide on Mountainouswords.com

Salisbury, Connecticut
Mountains of Berkshire County, Massachusetts
Landforms of Litchfield County, Connecticut
Mountains of Massachusetts
Taconic Mountains
Highest points of U.S. states